Sukhodol may refer to the following Russian entities:

 Sukhodol, Samara Oblast, an urban locality
 Sukhodol, Gafuriysky District, Republic of Bashkortostan, a rural locality
 Sukhodol, Vladimir Oblast, a rural locality
 Sukhodol, Volgograd Oblast, a rural locality
 Sukhodol (novel), a novel by Ivan Bunin

See also 
 Suhodol (disambiguation), places in the Balkans
 Suchodol (disambiguation), places in Poland and Czechia